This article concerns the period 269 BC – 260 BC.

References